The 2010–11 women's national hockey team will represent Canada in various tournaments during the season. The team will attempt to win the gold medal at the Women's World Championships. The head coach is former National Hockey League player Ryan Walter.

National team

News and notes
September 14: Four members of its 2010 Olympic gold medal-winning National Women's Team: Becky Kellar, Gina Kingsbury, Carla MacLeod and Colleen Sostorics have announced their retirements from international hockey.
October 5, 2010: Tessa Bonhomme was one of several athletes selected to participate in an all-athletes episode of Wipeout Canada.
March 15: Jennifer Botterill announces her retirement from international hockey. She was one of just four Canadian players to participate in the first four Olympic women's hockey tournaments. Her 184 games for Team Canada rank third all-time behind Hayley Wickenheiser and Jayna Hefford. She is fifth on the all-time scoring list with 65 goals and 109 assists for 174 points.

Four Nations Cup
September 21: Former NHL player Ryan Walter has been named the head coach for Team Canada at the 2010 Four Nations Cup. Assisting Walter will be current Minnesota Duluth assistant coach Laura Schuler and Ryerson Rams head coach Stephanie White.

Roster

Schedule

IIHF World championships
Canada will attempt to win the gold medal as they compete in the 2011 Women's World Ice Hockey Championships in Switzerland. A total of 37 players  were invited to the selection training camp, which takes place from April 2 to 5 at the Toronto MasterCard Centre. The 21 chosen players will represent Team Canada at the 2011 World Women's Championships.

Schedule

Under 18 team
The National Under 18 team competed in the IIHF World Under 18 tournament Jan. 1–8 in Stockholm, Sweden. The U.S. women defeated Canada in the final to win the first two world under-18 tournaments in 2008 and 2009 while Canada won the third in 2010. 2011 roster members Erin Ambrose and Emily Fulton were part of the 2010 gold medal team. The roster includes players born in 1993 and 1994. The 20 player roster was chosen from a 31 player training camp held in Toronto. The head coach will be Sarah Hodges (head coach of the University of Regina), while her assistants will be Cassie Turner and former national team member France Montour. On December 30, 2010, in an exhibition vs. the AIK Bantam boys team (at Husby Ishall Arena)  from Sweden, Canada bested the club in a 4–2 victory. On January 8, Canada lost the gold medal to the United States  by a 5–2 score.

Scoring leaders 2011 IIHF World Women's U18 Championship
GP = Games played; G = Goals; A = Assists; Pts = Points; +/− = Plus/Minus; PIM = Penalties In Minutes; POS = Position

Under 22 team

News and notes
Jim Fetter, head coach of the Wayne State Warriors women's ice hockey program, will be the head coach of Canada's National Women's Under-22 Team for the 2010–11 season. Fetter will also be the coach for Team Canada at the 2011 MLP Cup.

Summer training camp

Yellow/Blue intrasquad
Game 1: August 8, Blue 4, Yellow 2

Intrasquad notes
August 8: Four different players scored goals to give Blue a 4–2 win over Yellow on the first day of intersquad action at the National Women's Under-22 selection camp. The game was played in Toronto at the MasterCard Centre.

Isabel Menard and Natalie Spooner both scored in the first for Blue. Marie-Philip Poulin scored in the second to make it 2–1. Eventually, Blue would be ahead 4–1. Poulin tried to get Yellow into the game, scoring her second of the night. Yellow squad goalie Erica Howe made 40 saves.

Roster

Blue Roster

Yellow Roster

August series vs. USA
Marie-Philip Poulin scored a hat trick as the Under 22 team beat the US by a 7–2 score. With the victory, Canada had a three game sweep in its exhibition series vs. the US.

Series summary

MLP Cup
In the 2011 MLP Cup, Lacasse earned a shutout in a 5–0 defeat of Switzerland on January 4.  Prior to the match, she had made 57 consecutive starts for the Friars. Lacasse earned a shutout in the gold medal game of the 2011 MLP Cup, as Canada prevailed over Sweden by a 6–0 mark. Vicki Bendus was the leading scorer for Canada.

Schedule

Roster

2011 Winter Universiade

Group A final standings 
Six participating teams were placed in one group. After playing a round-robin, the top four teams in each group plus to the Semifinals. The fifth and sixth placed teams will play a playoff for fifth place.

Schedule

Semifinals

Finals

Roster
Goalies
Beth Clause
Liz Knox

Defense
Jenna Downey
Suzanne Fenerty
Carly Hill
Caitlin MacDonald
Alicia Martin
Jacalyn Sollis
Kelsey Webster

Forwards
Ann-Sophie Bettez
Vanessa Davidson
Kim Deschênes
Breanne George
Alicia Martin
Jacalyn Sollis
Jocelyn Leblanc
Andrea Ironside
Addie Miles
Mariève Provost
Ellie Seedhouse
Candice Styles
Courtney Unruh
Jessica Zerafa

Awards and honours
Rebecca Johnston, Player of the Game, Gold medal game at the 2010 Four Nations Cup
Female Hockey Breakthrough Award: (outstanding contribution to advancing female hockey)
Laurie Taylor-Bolton 
Liz MacKinnon Award: (special contributions of a Hockey Canada volunteer's spouse) Jill Donovan

References

External links
 Women's Hockey pages on Hockey Federation website

See also
 2009–10 Canada women's national ice hockey team
 2011–12 Canada women's national ice hockey team
 Canada women's national ice hockey team

 
Canada women's national ice hockey team seasons